Jacques De Brouwere (born 13 January 1938) is a Belgian former sailor. He competed in the Flying Dutchman event at the 1960 Summer Olympics.

References

External links
 

1938 births
Living people
Belgian male sailors (sport)
Olympic sailors of Belgium
Sailors at the 1960 Summer Olympics – Flying Dutchman
Sportspeople from Mons